Talukder Abdul Khaleque is a Bangladeshi politician who was elected mayor of Khulna City Corporation on two occasions and former Member of Parliament.

Career 
Khaleque served as a member of Parliament from Bagerhat-3 in 1991 as a Awami League candidate.

Khaleque served as a member of Parliament from Bagerhat-3 in 1996 as a Awami League candidate.

Khaleque served as a member of Parliament from Bagerhat-3 in 2001 as a Awami League candidate On 23 January 2003, he was sued by the Bureau of Anti-corruption for providing government contracts to his own company.

In August 2008, Khaleque was elected Mayor of Khulna.

Khaleque ran for the Khulna City Corporation on 27 May  2013. He lost to Md. Moniruzzaman Moni, the Bangladesh Nationalist Party candidate. In June 2013, there was a question on him in an exam in Pioneer Secondary Girls School. The school said they bought the question paper from Printek Press. He went on to be elected to parliament from Bagerhat-3 on 5 January 2014.

Khaleque was elected to parliament from Bagerhat-3 in 2018 but resigned to contest the Khulna City Corporation election. He was re-elected as mayor of KCC on 15 May 2018. He denied any irregularities in the election at a press conference in the Khulna Press Club on 16 May. He took charge on 25 September 2018.

Khaleque announced a 504.31 core taka budget for Khulna City Corporation in 2020. He is the President of Khulna unit of Awami League. He filed a case under the Digital Security Act against Khulna journalist Abu Tyeb for a Facebook post he made. Tyeb was arrested on 21 April 2021 under the case. On 13 May 2021, Tyeb was released on bail.

Personal life 
Khaleque's wife Habibun Nahar is the current Member of Parliament from Bagerhat-3. She was elected unopposed.

References

10th Jatiya Sangsad members
5th Jatiya Sangsad members
7th Jatiya Sangsad members
8th Jatiya Sangsad members
1952 births
Living people
Mayors of Khulna